Cape Hope (meaning 'the western little cape') is a headland in the Scoresby Sound, east Greenland, Sermersooq municipality.

There was a settlement east of the cape known as Kap Hope (Ittaajimmiit).

History
This headland was named Cape Hope by William Scoresby (1789 – 1857) in 1822 to honour Samuel Hope esq. of Everton, Liverpool, grandfather of Samuel Morley, 1st Baron Hollenden.

Geography
Cape Hope is the southwesternmost point of Liverpool Land. It rises east of the mouth of Hurry Inlet, opposite Cape Stewart. 

It is located in the northern shore of Scoresby Sound, near Ittoqqortoormiit.

See also
Geography of Greenland

References

External links
 Liverpool History Updates

Headlands of Greenland